Cındar is a village in the municipality of Rustov in the Quba Rayon of Azerbaijan.

References

Populated places in Quba District (Azerbaijan)